Twenty-Second Air Force (22 AF) is a Numbered Air Force component of Air Force Reserve Command (AFRC).  It was activated on 1 July 1993 and is headquartered at Dobbins Air Reserve Base, Georgia.

In the event of mobilization, some of the Twenty-Second Air Force's subordinate units would come under the operational control (OPCON) of the Air Mobility Command's (AMC) 21st Expeditionary Mobility Task Force, headquartered at McGuire Air Force Base, New Jersey, while others would come under OPCON of Air Education and Training Command's 19th Air Force at Randolph AFB, Texas.

Mission
22 AF is responsible for recruiting and training reservists and for maintaining subordinate units at the highest level of combat readiness. A by-product of training is to coordinate daily support of the active duty air force.

22 AF's wartime mission is to provide combat-ready airlift and support units and augments personnel requirements to Air Mobility Command in the United States.

Twenty-Second Air Force manages more than 25,000 Reservists and has 149 unit-equipped aircraft. Reserve crews in 22 AF fly the C-130 Hercules, including the WC-130 "Hurricane Hunter" aircraft, which are located at nine different Air Force Reserve wings. The wings, flying squadrons and support units are spread throughout nine states – from New York to Mississippi, Ohio and Minnesota, with its westernmost wing in Colorado Springs, Colorado.

Units
 94th Airlift Wing (Dobbins ARB, Georgia)
 302nd Airlift Wing (Peterson AFB, Colorado)
 340th Flying Training Group (Joint Base San Antonio, Texas)
 403rd Wing (Keesler AFB, Mississippi)
 908th Airlift Wing (Maxwell AFB, Alabama)
 910th Airlift Wing (Youngstown-Warren Air Reserve Station, Ohio)
 932nd Airlift Wing (Scott AFB, Illinois)
 934th Airlift Wing (Minneapolis St Paul ARS, Minnesota)

History
Established as the Domestic Division, Air Corps Ferrying Command in the early days of World War II, the organization's mission was the transport of newly produced aircraft from points within the United States to Ports of Embarkation for shipment to Britain and other overseas Allies.  In 1946, the organization was transferred to Air Transport Command and became, in essence, a military airline its Continental Division, managing transport routes within the United States.

When the USAF was created as a separate service in 1947, Military Air Transport Service was established to support the new Department of Defense, with responsibility for its support falling to the Department of the Air Force. Redesignated Western Transport Air Force (WESTAF), the organization managed all MATS operations from the Mississippi River west to the east coast of Africa until MATS was replaced by the Military Airlift Command in 1966.  When MATS became MAC, WESTAF was redesignated 22d AF, with headquarters at Travis AFB, CA.

During the 1960s, Twenty-Second Air Force transports flew missions worldwide, supporting the efforts of the United States in Southeast Asia, Europe and other places around the world.  In December 1974, the Twenty-Second Air Force absorbed Tactical Air Command's Twelfth Air Force C-130 Hercules tactical airlift operations.

On 29 March 1979, the Twenty-Second Air Force assumed responsibility for managing Military Airlift Command resources in the Pacific. For this mission, the unit provided a single commander for MAC airlift units in the Pacific theater; command and control of theater-assigned airlift forces for Pacific Air Forces; theater tactical airlift war planning and Pacific exercise planning; and aerial ports in the Pacific area to support the air movement of personnel, cargo, equipment, patients, and mail. The division participated in tactical exercises such as Team Spirit, Ulchi Focus Lens, and Capstan Dragon.

The unit was relieved from assignment to Military Airlift Command and assigned to Air Mobility Command on 1 June 1992. Activated the same day at Dobbins ARB, GA, with a change in assignment to the Air Force Reserve. It is under the peacetime command of Headquarters Air Force Reserve Command at Robins Air Force Base, GA.

Lineage

 Continental Division, Air Transport Command
 Established as the Domestic Wing, Air Corps Ferrying Command and activated  on 18 February 1942
 Redesignated Domestic Wing, Army Air Forces Ferry Command on 9 March 1942
 Redesignated Domestic Wing, Army Air Forces Ferrying Command on 31 March 1942
 Redesignated Ferrying Division, Air Transport Command on 20 June 1942
 Redesignated Continental Division, Air Transport Command on 1 March 1946
 Discontinued on 31 October 1946
 Consolidated on 29 March 1979 with Twenty-Second Air Force as Twenty-Second Air Force

 Twenty-Second Air Force
 Designated and organized as Continental Division, Military Air Transport Sservice on 1 July 1948
 Redesignated Western Transport Air Force on 1 July 1958
 Redesignated Twenty-Second Air Force on 8 January 1966
 Consolidated on 29 March 1979 with Continental Division, Air Transport Command
 Inactivated on 1 July 1993
 Activated on 1 July 1993

Assignments
 Air Corps Ferrying Command (later Army Air Forces Ferry Command, Army Air Forces Ferrying Command, Air Transport Command, 18 February 1942 – 31 October 1946
 Military Air Transport Service (later Military Airlift Command), 1 July 1948
 Air Mobility Command, 1 June 1992 – 1 July 1993
 Air Force Reserve (later Air Force Reserve Command), 1 July 1993 – present

Components

Continental Division, Air Transport Command
 Sectors

 California Sector, Air Corps Ferrying Command (later 6th Ferrying Group), 18 February 1942 – 31 March 1944 
 Long Beach Municipal Airport, California
 Replaced by 556th AAF Base Unit (6th Ferrying Group), 31 March 1944 – 1 December 1946
 Detroit Sector, Air Corps Ferrying Command (later 3d Ferrying Group), 18 February 1942 – 31 March 1944
 Wayne County Airport, Michigan
 Replaced by 553d AAF Base Unit (3d Ferrying Group), 31 March 1944 – 15 January 1946
 Midwest Sector, Air Corps Ferrying Command (later 5th Ferrying Group), 18 February 1942 – 31 March 1944
 Hensley Field, Texas
 Replaced by 555th AAF Base Unit(5th Ferrying Group), 31 March 1944 – 9 August 1946
 Nashville Sector, Air Corps Ferrying Command (later 4th Ferrying Group), 18 February 1942 – 31 March 1944
 Nashville Municipal Airport, Tennessee
 Replaced by 554th AAF Base Unit (4th Ferrying Group), 31 March 1944-c. December 1945
 Northeast Sector, Air Corps Ferrying Command (later 2d Ferrying Group), 18 February 1942 – 31 March 1944
 Logan Field, New Castle Army Air Field, Delaware
 Replaced by 552d AAF Base Unit (2d Ferrying Group), 31 March 1944 – 31 December 1945
 Northwest Sector, Air Corps Ferrying Command (later 7th Ferrying Group), 18 February 1942 – 31 March 1944
 Boeing Field, Washington, Gore Field, Montana
 Replaced by 557th AAF Base Unit (7th Ferrying Group), 31 March 1944 – 14 December 1945
 Central Sector, Air Transport Command, 25–31 March 1944
 Western Sector, Air Transport Command, 25–31 March 1944
 Eastern Sector, Air Transport Command, 25–31 March 1944

 Wings

 23d AAF Ferrying Wing (later North Atlantic Wing, Air Transport Command), Ferrying Command, 20 Jun 1942 – 1 Sep 1943
 Presque Isle Army Air Field, Maine
 24th AAF Ferrying Wing (later South Atlantic Wing, Air Transport Command), 27 Jun 1942  – 9 October 1943
 Atkinson Field, Georgetown, British Guiana
 25th AAF Ferrying Wing (later South Pacific Wing, Air Transport Command), 27 Jun 1942 – 30 September 1943
 Hamilton Field, California
 26th AAF Ferrying Wing (later Africa Middle East Wing, Air Transport Command), 27 Jun 1942 – 30 Sep 1943
 Payne Airfield, Cairo, Egypt
 27th AAF Ferrying Wing (later Caribbean Wing, Air Transport Command), 19 Jun 1942 – 16 Oct 1943
 Foreign Wing, Ferrying Command, 28 Feb – 19 Jun 1942
 Domestic Transportation Wing, Air Transport Command, 27 Nov 1944 – 15 Jan 1945
 Central Ferrying Wing, Air Transport Command, 22 Oct 1944 – 10 Mar 1945
 Western Ferrying Wing, Air Transport Command, 22 Oct 1944 – 10 Mar 1945
 Eastern Ferrying Wing, Air Transport Command, 22 Oct 1944 – 10 Mar 1945

 Groups

 2d Ferrying Group (see Northeast Sector, Air Corps Ferrying Command)
 3d Ferrying Group (see Detroit Sector, Air Corps Ferrying Command)
 4th Ferrying Group (see Nashville Sector, Air Corps Ferrying Command)
 5th Ferrying Group (see Midwest Sector, Air Corps Ferrying Command)
 6th Ferrying Group (see California Sector, Air Corps Ferrying Command)
 7th Ferrying Group (see Northwest Sector, Air Corps Ferrying Command)
 20th Ferrying Group, 3 Feb 1943 – 31 March 1944
 Nashville Municipal Airport, Tennessee
 Replaced by 558 AAF Base Unit (20th Ferrying Group), 31 Mar 1944 – 9 Apr 1946
 21st Ferrying Group, 17 Nov 1943 – 31 March 1944
 Palm Springs Army Airfield, California
 Replaced by  560 AAF Base Unit (21st Ferrying Group), 31 Mar 1944 – 20 May 1946
 33d Ferrying Group, 4 Mar 1943 – 31 Mar 1944
 Fairfax Field, Kansas
 Replaced by 569 AAF Base Unit (33d Ferrying Group), 31 Mar 1944 – 15 Apr 1945

Twenty-Second Air Force
Divisions
 323d Air Division, 1 Jul 1958 – 8 May 1960
 834th Air (later Airlift) Division, 1 – 31 Dec 1974, 1 Oct 1978 – 1 Apr 1992

Wings

 60th Military Airlift (later, 60 Airlift) Wing, 8 Jan 1966 – 15 Feb 1979; 21 Jul 1980 – 1 Jul 1993
 61st Military Airlift (later, 61 Military Airlift Support) Wing, 8 Jan 1966 – 1 Oct 1978
 62d Troop Carrier, Heavy (later 62 Air Transport Wing, Heavy; 62 Military Airlift Wing; 62 Airlift Wing) Wing, 1 Jul 1957 – 1 Jul 1993
 63d Troop Carrier, Heavy (later 63 Military Airlift Wing, 63 Airlift Wing) Wing, 1 Jul 1957 – 1 Jul 1993
 94th Airlift Wing, 1 Jul 1993 – 1 Oct 1994; 1 Apr 1997 – present
 97th Air Mobility Wing, 1 Oct 1992 – 1 Jul 1993
 302d Airlift Wing, 1 Apr 1997 – present
 314th Tactical Airlift (later 314 Airlift) Wing, 31 Dec 1974 – 1 Jul 1993
 315th Airlift Wing (Associate) (later 315 Airlift Wing), 1 Jul 1993 – 2011
 375th Military Airlift (later 375 Airlift) Wing, 1 Feb 1990 – 1 Jul 1993
 403d Airlift Wing (later 403 Wing), 1 Jul 1993 – 1 Oct 1994; 1 Apr 1997 – present
 434th Air Refueling Wing, 1 Oct 1993 – 1 Apr 1997
 439th Airlift Wing, 1 Jul 1993 – 2011
 440th Airlift Wing, 1 Apr 1997 – 18 Sep 2016
 443d Military Airlift Wing, Training (later 443 Airlift Wing), 1 Apr 1973 – 1 Oct 1992
 445th Airlift Wing, 1 Oct 1994 – 1 Apr 1997
 459th Airlift Wing, 1 Jul 1993 – 1 Apr 2003
 463d Tactical Airlift (later 463 Airlift) Wing, 31 Dec 1974 – 1 Jul 1993

 512th Airlift Wing (Associate) (later 512 Airlift Wing), 1 Jul 1993 – 2011
 514th Airlift Wing (Associate) (later 514 Air Mobility Wing), 1 Jul 1993 – 2011
 908th Airlift Wing, 1 Apr 1997 – present
 910th Airlift Wing, 1 Apr 1997 – present
 911th Airlift Wing, 1 Apr 1997 – present
 913th Airlift Wing, 1 Apr 1997 – 1 Oct 2007
 914th Airlift Wing, 1 Apr 1997 – present
 916th Air Refueling Wing, 1 Oct 1994 – 1 Apr 1997
 927th Air Refueling Wing, 1 Oct 1994 – 1 Apr 1997
 934th Airlift Wing, 1 Apr 1997 – present
 1550th Combat Crew Training (later 542 Crew Training) Wing, 21 May 1990 – 1 Jul 1993
 1501st Air Transport Wing (later 1501 Air Transport Wing, Heavy), 25 Jun – 1 Jul 1958; 8 May 1960 – 8 Jan 1966.
 1502d Air Transport Wing, Heavy, 24 Jun 1958 – 8 Jan 1966
 1503d Air Transport Wing, Heavy, 24 Jun 1958 – 22 Jan 1966
 1608th Air Transport Wing, Medium, 1 Jul 1957 – 1 May 1958
 1701st Air Transport Wing, 1 Oct 1948 – 1 May 1953
 1705th Air Transport Wing (later 1705 Air Transport Group), 24 Aug 1950 – 1 Oct 1951
 1707th Air Transport Wing (Training) (later, 1707 Air Transport Wing, Heavy [Training]), 1 May 1954 – 1 Nov 1958
 Navy Air Transport Wing (later Navy Air Transport Wing, Pacific), 1 Jul 1957 – 30 Jun 1967

Groups

 1501st Air Transport Group (later 1704 Air Transport Group), 1 Jan 1950 – 1 Jul 1952
 1601st Air Transport Group (later 1703 Air Transport Group, 1703 Air Transport Group, Heavy), 20 Oct 1949 – 18 Jun 1957
 1700th Air Transport Group (later 1700 Air Transport Group, Medium), 1 Oct 1948 – 18 Dec 1957
 1701st Air Transport Group, 1 May–Jun 1953
 1702d Air Transport Group, 1 Oct 1948 – 17 Jul 1950
 1705th Air Transport Group (later Air Transport Group, Heavy), 24 Jan 1953 – 1 Jul 1957, 24 Jun 1958 – 18 Jun 1960.

 1st Aeromedical Transport Group Light, 8 Nov 1956 – 6 Jun 1964
 1706th Air Transport Group (Air Evac) (later 1706 Air Transport Group, Medium [Air Evac]; 1706 Air Transport Group, Light [Air Evac]), 1 Feb 1953 – 8 Nov 1956.
 1708th Ferrying Group (later 1708 Wing), 16 Jul 1951 – 1 Mar 1958.
 413th Flight Test Group, 1 Oct 2003 – present
 622d Flight Test Group, 24 Sep 2001 – 1 Oct 2003
 616th Military Airlift Group, 1 Nov 1975 – 9 Aug 1990, 1 Apr 1992 – 1 Jun 1992

Squadrons
 16th Air Transport (later 1254 Air Transport) Squadron, 1 Sep 1948 – 12 Mar 1951
 1726th Air Transport Squadron (Special), 1 Oct 1948 – 23 Apr 1949
 1737th Ferrying Squadron, 24 Sep 1950 – 16 Jul 1951
 Air Transport Squadron (VR-3), USN, 1 Oct 1948-c. Dec 1948, 1 Dec 1949 – 1 Jul 1957.

Stations
 Bolling Airfield, Washington D.C., 28 December 1941
 Lunken Airport, Cincinnati, Ohio, 1 February 1943
 Kelly Air Force Base, Texas, 1 July 1948
 Travis Air Force Base, California, 25 June 1958
 Dobbins ARB, Georgia, 1 July 1993

List of commanders

References

Notes
 Explanatory notes

 Citations

Bibliography

 

 Air Force 22
22